Donald F. Blessing (December 26, 1905 – July 4, 2000) was an American coxswain who competed in the 1928 Summer Olympics, held in Amsterdam. Blessing was born in Hollister, California and attended Visalia Union High School.

In 1928, he was the coxswain of the American boat, which won the gold medal in the eights.  Don was the Most Valuable Man as voted by his teammates on the UC/USA crew. The USA eight was composed of men from the University of California and was the first of 3 Olympic eights that would come from Cal and win gold. The University sent gold medal-winning crews in 1932 (Los Angeles) and 1948 (London), as well.

Don Blessing was a lifelong Californian, residing in Piedmont, CA and Belvedere, CA for most of his adult life. He also was a lifelong Bear Backer, a charter member of the San Francisco Grid Club and among the first group of inductees to the University California Hall of Fame.

Blessing was one of eight minority owners in what originally was known as the Oakland Señores football club, and as such was indirectly a founding owner in the American Football League in 1960. Blessing, Chet Soda and five of the other six owners sold their stakes to fellow partner F. Wayne Valley before the start of the inaugural season, by which point the team was named the Oakland Raiders.

He had two children - Sherrell Blessing and Don Blessing Jr. (deceased in 2003) and five grandchildren. He also had two great-grandchildren.
 profile
 

1905 births
2000 deaths
Coxswains (rowing)
Rowers at the 1928 Summer Olympics
Olympic gold medalists for the United States in rowing
University of California, Berkeley alumni
American male rowers
Medalists at the 1928 Summer Olympics